South American U23 records in the sport of athletics are ratified by the CONSUDATLE, which maintains an official list for such performances, but only in a specific list of outdoor events. All other records, including all indoor records, shown on this list are tracked by statisticians not officially sanctioned by the world governing body. Athletics records comprise the best performance of an athlete before the year of their 23rd birthday. Technically, in all under-23 age divisions, the age is calculated "on December 31 of the year of competition" to avoid age group switching during a competitive season.

Outdoor

Key to tables:

+ = en route to a longer distance

A = affected by altitude

Men

Women

Mixed

Indoor

Men

Women

Notes

References
General
CONSUDATLE:South American Records 28 September 2022 updated
Specific

Under-23
South American